Brilliant Circles is the second album led by American jazz pianist Stanley Cowell, recorded in 1969. It was first released on the Freedom label and rereleased on CD with bonus tracks on the Black Lion label.

Reception

In his review for AllMusic, Scott Yanow states: "The challenging repertoire falls between advanced hard bop and the avant-garde, consistently inspiring the talented players to play at their most creative. Recommended". There is a consensus among many collectors that the Black Lion CD edition, which includes one bonus track and an alternate take of the title track, was very poorly mastered (with reduced volume in the right channel, resulting in the virtual inaudibility of Tyrone Washington's woodwinds).

Track listing
All compositions by Stanley Cowell except as indicated
 "Brilliant Circles" – 15:33
 "Earthly Heavens" (Tyrone Washington) – 7:45
 "Musical Prayers" (Washington) – 10:12 Bonus track on CD reissue	
 "Boo Ann's Grand" (Woody Shaw) – 9:07
 "Bobby's Tune" (Bobby Hutcherson) – 10:42
 "Brilliant Circles" [Take 2] – 15:45 Bonus track on CD reissue

Personnel
Stanley Cowell – piano
Woody Shaw – trumpet, maracas
Tyrone Washington – tenor saxophone, flute, clarinet, maracas, tambourine
Bobby Hutcherson – vibraphone
Reggie Workman – bass, electric bass
Joe Chambers – drums

References

1972 albums
Stanley Cowell albums
Freedom Records albums
Black Lion Records albums